Bülbül yuvası and in ( Ush Al-Bulbul) both meaning literally "nightingale's nest" is a Middle Eastern phyllo dough dessert. It takes its name from its hollow and circular shape. Having been baked, warm syrup is sprinkled, and the hollow center is filled with pistachios before being served.

Notes

See also
Baklava
Şöbiyet
Sütlü Nuriye

References

External links
 Image of bülbül yuvası dessert